The Senate House is a 1720s building of the University of Cambridge in England, used formerly for meetings of its senate and now mainly for graduation ceremonies.

Location and construction

The building, which is situated in the centre of the city between King's and Gonville and Caius Colleges, was designed by architect James Gibbs, based to an unclear extent on designs by the gentleman-architect Sir James Burrough, and built in 1722–1730 by Gibbs in a neo-classical style using Portland stone. The ceremony to lay the first stone was performed by Thomas Crosse, then Vice-Chancellor, on 22 June 1722. The site was previously used for houses, which were purchased by an Act of Parliament, dated 11 June 1720. It was officially opened in July 1730, although the western end was not completed until 1768.

The Senate House was originally intended to be one side of a quadrangle, however the rest of the structure was never completed. It forms part of the Old Schools Site. It is a Grade I listed building.

History and usage

Graduation ceremony

Graduates receiving an undergraduate degree wear the academic dress that they were entitled to before graduating: for example, most students becoming Bachelors of Arts wear undergraduate gowns and not BA gowns. Graduates are presented in the Senate House college by college, in order of foundation or recognition by the university, except for the royal colleges.

The 31 colleges process to the Senate House in the following order:

During the congregation, graduands are brought forth by the Praelector of their college, who takes them by the right hand, and presents them to the vice-chancellor for the degree they are about to take. The Praelector presents graduands with the following Latin statement, substituting the name of the degree for "":

The now-graduate then rises, bows and leaves the Senate House through the Doctor's door, where he or she receives his or her certificate, into Senate House passage.

At the University of Cambridge, each graduation is a separate act of the university's governing body, the Regent House, and must be voted on as with any other act. A formal meeting of the Regent House, known as a Congregation, is held for this purpose.

University's 800th Anniversary

As part of the University's 800th anniversary celebrations in 2008, the side of the Senate House was illuminated with a light show, illustrating aspects of the history of the university.

Traditions and legends

Maths tripos results

At the end of the academic year, class-lists for most degrees are posted up on the outer wall of the building. The results of Part II and Part III of the Mathematical Tripos, however, are read out to the waiting students from the balcony of the Senate House, after which piles of class-lists are thrown to the ground like confetti in a time-honoured manner.

Austin Seven

A battered Austin Seven van was found on the apex of the Senate House roof on the morning of 8 June 1958. The van had been placed there the night before by a party of engineering students from Gonville & Caius College. They found the derelict Austin Seven in Harston and towed it into Cambridge. They removed the engine and rear axle to make it light enough to winch up to the roof, and hauled it up using cables and scaffolding they'd stolen from King's College. It took the University a week to get the van down and the prank received much media attention at the time.

A variety of similar student pranks have been carried out on the roof of the building since. Most notably, a fully-decorated Christmas tree was placed on the corner of the Senate House roof in November 2022, assumed to be the work of night climbers.

BBC Election Debate 2017
On 31 May 2017, Senate House hosted the BBC Election Debate ahead of the UK General Election eight days later.

Mishal Husain chaired audience questions for Jeremy Corbyn, Tim Farron, Caroline Lucas, Paul Nuttall, Angus Robertson, Amber Rudd, and Leanne Wood.

References

External links 

 Geographic coordinates: 

School buildings completed in 1730
Buildings and structures of the University of Cambridge
James Gibbs buildings
Grade I listed buildings in Cambridge